Dracula octavioi is a species of orchid found in Colombia.

References 

octavioi
Plants described in 1979